Ernest Henry Woollacott (20 November 1888 – 18 April 1977) was an Australian Methodist minister, social welfare analyst and temperance advocate. Woollacott was born in Burra, South Australia and died in Marion, Adelaide, South Australia.

See also

References

Australian Methodist ministers
Australian temperance activists
Australian Methodists
1888 births
1977 deaths
People from Burra, South Australia